Antonio Alzamendi Casas (born 7 June 1956) is a Uruguayan former footballer who played as a forward.

His official debut was with the Uruguayan team Wanderers de Durazno. Alzamendi played for Uruguay at the 1986 and 1990 FIFA World Cups, scoring against West Germany in 1986. He played several years for River Plate of Argentina, winning both the Copa Libertadores de América and Intercontinental Cup in 1986. On Intercontinental Cup final, Alzamendi was named as man of the match and got the only goal of the game in the 28th minute when he headed into the net after his initial shot had hit the post and then came back off the goalkeeper. That year he was also named South American Footballer of the Year.

In July 2001 he was appointed as coach of the Australian National Soccer League team Canberra Cosmos. However his contract was then terminated shortly after due to financial problems with the club.

In 2008, he became the coach of Sport Ancash from Peru.

References

External links
 
playerhistory

1956 births
Living people
People from Durazno
Uruguayan footballers
Uruguayan people of Spanish descent
Uruguayan people of Basque descent
Uruguayan expatriate footballers
Uruguay international footballers
Association football forwards
Club Atlético Independiente footballers
Expatriate footballers in Argentina
Expatriate footballers in Spain
Expatriate footballers in Mexico
Club Atlético River Plate footballers
Club Nacional de Football players
Peñarol players
CD Logroñés footballers
Textil Mandiyú footballers
Rampla Juniors players
Tecos F.C. footballers
Uruguayan Primera División players
Argentine Primera División players
La Liga players
Liga MX players
Uruguayan expatriate sportspeople in Argentina
Uruguayan expatriate sportspeople in Spain
Uruguayan expatriate sportspeople in Mexico
1986 FIFA World Cup players
1990 FIFA World Cup players
1983 Copa América players
1987 Copa América players
1989 Copa América players
Sud América players
South American Footballer of the Year winners
Copa América-winning players
Rampla Juniors managers
Deportivo Maldonado managers
Centro Atlético Fénix managers
Sport Áncash managers